Mengly Jandy Quach  (born 25 March 1969) is a Cambodian businessman and philanthropist. He is a survivor of the Cambodian genocide. He is the founder of the Mengly J. Quach Education.

Early life
Quach was born in Battambang Province, Cambodia on 25 March 1969. During and after Khmer Rouge regime, Quach survived the Dangrek genocide in Dângrêk Mountains areas: after being pushed back by the Thai Royal Army, his family eventually managed to find refuge in Thailand in their second attempt to escape Cambodia. Quach and his family were resettled in the United States in 1984 from Khao-I-Dang refugee camp after the war (their first attempt was the journey to Nong Chan Refugee Camp in 1979). He was raised and educated in California.

Career
He attended University of California, Berkeley in 1991 for Pre-Med and received his Doctor of Medicine in General Medicine from Spartan Health Sciences University in 1998. Quach also completed his medical clerkship at the University of Illinois Hospital in Chicago. He received his Masters in Public Health Practice from the University of Massachusetts Amherst in 2007. Quach was a professor at the Cleveland College in California until 2002.

In 2002, Quach returned to Cambodia where he worked as public health advisor of Integrated Management of Childhood Illness (IMCI) for Partners for Development  and taught at the Pannasastra University of Cambodia and University of Cambodia.

In 2005, Quach founded Mengly J. Quach Education. Its Aii Language Center and American Intercon School, engage in education, health care, food, media and financial services. By 2022, his educational programs had grown from a single classroom with just four students into one of Cambodia's biggest educational networks, with over twenty school buildings, over 17,000 students, more than 1,750 staff and boasts 50,000 alumni.

Quach was the owner and advisory board of  ThmeyThmey.com. It was launched in 2012 as part of Mengly J. Quash Holdings. In May 2017, Quach resigned from advisory board of Thmey Thmey. In his resignation letter, he said he sold his shares and has no more connection with ThmeyThmey. Quach was an elected Board member of Transparency International Cambodia during 2010 - 2013. He was also known by a controversy for criticizing the Cambodia's public health in 2016, saying that nine in ten doctors in the country were sub-par and treated their patients badly. He also commented that Cambodia's system for educating doctors remains weak and the training for doctors in Cambodia is very short. His comments prompted a government-affiliated doctors’ association to demand an apology and retraction. Then, since 2017, his medical license has been denied.

Philanthropy
Quach started doing his charitable works since he was 10 years old by helping to provide food to poor people in the US. He used to work in a charity that provided free medical services to the poor and homeless while he was a medical student. He stated that his grandparents and parents liked showing kindness to others and helping the most-in-need people.

Quach founded MJQ Foundation in 2005. The majority of its funds are the profits of his businesses. MJQ Foundation has been helping the communities through various programs and projects.

As an oknha, he has insisted on the importance of virtuous leadership in Khmer society, through many publications in virtue ethics and business. In partnership with the Office of United Nations High Commissioner for Human Rights in Cambodia, he defends the idea that businesses should care more about human rights in Cambodia.

Quach is also known for a range of philanthropic endeavours, from sponsoring spelling contests, to sponsoring education and most recently during the economic crisis caused by the Covid-19 outbreak. For that reason, Quach has voiced criticism against crony capitalism and abuse of power by certain okhna in Cambodia "I think this re-drafting should be considered because some Oknha have used their titles in the past to protect themselves from the consequences of committing immoral acts, which create discontent among the public. We know that some oknhas have committed violence, or had crooked business dealings. Some have even been involved in deforestation. The actions of those who hold this title affects the honour of the King who bestows it."

Personal life
Quach lives in Phnom Penh with his wife and their two daughters.

Recognitions
In 2009, Quach was made Knight Grand Officer in the Royal Order of Monisaraphon and given the Khmer Royal title of Oknha by His Majesty King Norodom Sihamoni. In 2021, he was given the Khmer Royal title of Neak Oknha by His Majesty King Norodom Sihamoni for his community, charity and philanthropic works. He also received various local and international certificates and awards from around the world.

Selected publications
 Quach, Mengly J. (2020). Quach M. J., Poems from the Heart, Mengly J. Quach University Press. 
 Quach, Mengly J. (2020). Quach M. J., The Philosophy Collection, Mengly J. Quach University Press. 
 Quach, Mengly J. (2019). Mengly J. Quach's Business Ideas. Mengly J. Quach University Press. 
 Quach, Mengly J. (2018). Mengly J. Quach's 108 Ideal Practices. Mengly J. Quach University Press. 
 Quach, Mengly J. (2018). Dangrek Mountains …unforgettable. Mengly J. Quach University Press. 
 Dharmendra, Singh K.; Quach, Mengly J. (2016). Dr. Mengly, Coffee and Me: Healthy Conversations. Mengly J. Quach University Press. 
 Quach, Mengly J. (2016). Dr. Mengly's Business Concepts. Mengly J. Quach University Press. 
 Quach, Mengly J. (2016). You Are The Good. Better. Best. Mengly J. Quach University Press. ,

Sources
 Oeur S., Torn V., Sem R., Hang P., Yeng Chh., On K., A Collection of Short Stories, My Role Model Oknha Dr. Mengly J. Quach, Mengly J. Quach University Press, January 2020
 Oeur S., Dr. Mengly J. Quach's Poems and Me, Mengly J. Quach University Press, August 2019
 Hang P., How I came to know Dr. Mengly Jandy Quach, Mengly J. Quach University Press, August 2019

References

Cambodian businesspeople
University of Massachusetts Amherst alumni
1969 births
Living people
Members of the Royal Order of Monisaraphon
Cambodian doctors
Academic staff of the University of Cambodia